Mount Hotham Airport  is a small Australian regional airport, which serves the Victorian ski resort of Mount Hotham. The airport opened in 2000, and it is Australia's highest-altitude airport.

Airlines and destinations

QantasLink formerly served Mount Hotham with Bombardier Q200s from Sydney, but ceased flights after the airline reported heavy losses in 2011.

Incidents and accidents
On 8 July 2005, a Piper PA-31-350 Navajo Chieftain charter plane crashed into terrain while attempting to make a landing at the airport, killing the pilot and two passengers. Fragments of the aircraft were said to have dropped on the ground at the nearby sub-alpine community of Cobungra.

Gallery

See also
 List of airports in Victoria

References

Airports in Victoria (Australia)
Victorian Alps
Airports established in 2000
2000 establishments in Australia